Enrique A. J. Marcatili (born July 22, 1925, in Villa María Córdoba, Argentina - died January 19, 2021, in N.J.) was an Argentine-American physicist. Together with Stewart E. Miller and Tingye Li, all of Bell Laboratories in Holmdel Township, New Jersey, he was winner of the IEEE's Baker Prize in 1975. Marcatili has been described as "a pioneer in optical fiber research," and he was a member of the National Academy of Engineering.

Marcatili has been a resident of Rumson, New Jersey.

References 
 

1925 births
American electrical engineers
21st-century American physicists
Fellow Members of the IEEE
2021 deaths
Members of the United States National Academy of Engineering
People from Rumson, New Jersey
Scientists at Bell Labs
Engineers from New Jersey